Momen Naji (born 9 October 1996) is a Syrian professional footballer who plays as a midfielder for Syrian club Al-Shorta and the Syrian national football team. He made his debut for the national team in a friendly against Lebanon on 24 May 2015.

References 

1996 births
Living people
Syrian footballers
Syria international footballers
Al-Jaish Damascus players
Sportspeople from Damascus
Association football midfielders
Syrian Premier League players